John James Pearson (October 25, 1800 – May 30, 1888) was an American politician and judge from Pennsylvania who served as an Anti-Jacksonian member of the U.S. House of Representatives.

Biography
Pearson was born near Darby in Delaware County, Pennsylvania to Bevan and Anne (Warner) Pearson.  He moved with his parents to Mercer, Pennsylvania, in 1805.  He studied law, was admitted to the bar in August 1822 and commenced practice in Mercer County, Pennsylvania.  He was elected as an Anti-Jacksonian to the Twenty-fourth Congress to fill the vacancy caused by the resignation of John Banks and served from December 5, 1836, to March 3, 1837.  He was not a candidate for renomination in 1836.  He resumed the practice of law and served as a Whig member of Pennsylvania State Senate for the 20th district from 1838 to 1842.  He was appointed president judge of Dauphin and Lebanon Counties on April 7, 1849, and served until January 1, 1882.  He died in Harrisburg, Pennsylvania, in 1888 and was interred in Mount Kalmia Cemetery.

Footnotes

Sources

The Political Graveyard

Further reading
Pearson, William. Decisions of the Honorable John J. Pearson: Judge of the Twelfth Judicial District of Pennsylvania (Rees Welsh & Co., Philadelphia. 1880)

External links

|-

1800 births
1888 deaths
19th-century American judges
19th-century American politicians
Burials at Harrisburg Cemetery
National Republican Party members of the United States House of Representatives from Pennsylvania
Pennsylvania lawyers
Pennsylvania state court judges
Pennsylvania state senators
Pennsylvania Whigs
People from Delaware County, Pennsylvania
Politicians from Harrisburg, Pennsylvania
19th-century American lawyers